The Alliance for a Democratic Dynamic is an opposition alliance of Benin which contested the Beninese parliamentary election of 2007.

It comprised the Social Democratic Party of Bruno Amoussou, the Renaissance Party of Benin of former President of Benin, Nicéphore Soglo and the African Movement for Development and Progress of Antoine Kolawolé Idji.

The alliance won 20 out of 83 seats, down from the 34 seats won by the three parties in the Beninese parliamentary election of 2003, when the SDP was part of the pro-government Union for Future Benin.

The alliance was superseded by an expanded coalition, Union Makes the Nation, in time for the presidential election of 2011.

Political party alliances in Benin